This is a sub-list of the List of marine spiny-finned fishes of South Africa for perch-like fishes recorded from the oceans bordering South Africa.
This list comprises locally used common names, scientific names with author citation and recorded ranges. Ranges specified may not be the entire known range for the species, but should include the known range within the waters surrounding the Republic of South Africa.

List ordering and taxonomy complies where possible with the current usage in Wikispecies, and may differ from the cited source, as listed citations are primarily for range or existence of records for the region. Sub-taxa within any given taxon are arranged alphabetically as a general rule. Synonyms may be listed where useful.

Order Perciformes

Suborder: Acanthuroidei

Family: Acanthuridae — Surgeonfishes and unicornfishes

Subfamily: Acanthurinae — Surgeonfishes
Tailring surgeon Acanthurus blochii Valenciennes, 1835 (Indo-Pacific south to Durban)
Pencilled surgeon Acanthurus dussumieri Valenciennes, 1835 (Port Alfred to Mozambique)(Algoa Bay to western Pacific)
Powder-blue surgeonfish Acanthurus leucosternon Bennett, 1832 (Sodwana Bay to Indonesia)
Bluebanded surgeon Acanthurus lineatus (Linnaeus, 1758) (Indo-Pacific south to Durban)
Elongate surgeon Acanthurus mata (Cuvier, 1829) (Indo-Pacific south to Durban)
Epaulette surgeon Acanthurus nigricauda Duncker and Mohr, 1929 (Indo-Pacific south to Durban)
Brown surgeon Acanthurus nigrofuscus (Forsskål, 1775) (Indo-Pacific south to Coffee Bay)
Lieutenant surgeonfish Acanthurus tennanti Günther, 1861 (Western Indian Ocean from Natal to Sri Lanka)
Chocolate surgeon Acanthurus thompsoni (Fowler, 1923) (Indo-Pacific south to Sodwana Bay)
Convict surgeon Acanthurus triostegus (Linnaeus, 1758) (Indo-Pacific south to Bashee River, with postlarvae as far as Algoa Bay)
Yellowfin surgeon Acanthurus xanthopterus Valenciennes, 1835 (Durban to eastern Pacific)
Twospot bristletooth Ctenochaetus binotatus Randall, 1955 (Indo-Pacific south to Natal)
Striped bristletooth Ctenochaetus striatus (Quoy & Gaimard, 1825) (Indo-Pacific south to Natal)
Spotted bristletooth Ctenochaetus strigosus (Bennett, 1828) (Indo-Pacific south to Natal)
Palette surgeon Paracanthurus hepatus (Natal to central Pacific)
Spotted tang Zebrasoma gemmatum (Valenciennes, 1835) (Mauritius, Madagascar, Sodwana Bay and 3 specimens from Durban)
Twotone tang Zebrasoma scopas (Cuvier, 1829) (Indo-Pacific south to Natal)
Sailfin tang Zebrasoma veliferum (Bloch, 1797) (Indo-Pacific south to Natal)

Subfamily: Nasinae — Unicornfishes
Whitemargin unicorn Naso annulatus (Quoy & Gaimard, 1825)
Humpback unicorn Naso brachycentron (Valenciennes, 1835) (Indo-Pacific south to Natal)
Spotted unicorn Naso brevirostris (Valenciennes, 1835) (Indo-Pacific south to Durban, with juveniles drifting to Algoa Bay)
Orange-spine unicorn Naso lituratus (Forster, 1801) (Indo-Pacific south to Durban)
Humpnose unicorn Naso tuberosus Lacepède 1802 (Natal to Gilbert Islands)
Bluespine unicorn Naso unicornis (Forsskål, 1775) (Indo-Pacific south to Natal)
Bignose unicorn Naso vlamingii (Valenciennes, 1835) (Indo-Pacific south to Natal)

Family: Ephippidae — Batfishes
Orbicular batfish Platax orbicularis (Forsskål, 1775) (Indo-West Pacific south to Knysna)
Dusky batfis Platax pinnatus (Linnaeus. 1758) (Indo-West Pacific south to Sodwana Bay, possibly Durban)
Longfin batfish Platax teira (Forsskål, 1775) (Indo-West Pacific south to Algoa Bay)
Spadefish Tripterodon orbis Playfair, 1867 (Port Elizabeth to Kenya)

Family: Luvaridae — Louvar
Louvar Luvarus imperialis Rafinesque, 1810 (All oceans and Mediterranean sea, Not reported in polar seas or near equator)

Family: Scatophagidae — Scatties
Scatty Scatophagus tetracanthus (Lacepède, 1802) (Indo-West Pacific south to Durban)

Family: Siganidae — Rabbitfishes
Starspotted rabbitfish Siganus stellatus (Forsskål, 1775) (Kosi Bay north to Red Sea)
Whitespotted rabbitfish Siganus sutor (Valenciennes, 1835) (Western Indian Ocean, stragglers as far south as Knysna)

Family: Zanclidae — Moorish idol
Moorish idol Zanclus cornutus (Linnaeus, 1758) (Africa to Mexico south to Mossel Bay) (syn. Zanclus canescens)

Suborder: Blennioidei

Family: Blenniidae — Blennies
Dwarf blenny Alloblennius parvus Springer & Spreitzar, 1978 (Comores and 1 specimen from Sodwana Bay)
Moustached rockskipper Antennablennius australis Fraser-Brunner, 1951 (Port Elizabeth to Red Sea)
Horned rockskipper Antennablennius bifilum (Günther, 1861) (Port Alfred to the Persian Gulf)
Floating blenny Aspidontus dussumieri (Valenciennes, 1836) (Red Sea south to Knysna)
Mimic blenny Aspidontis taeniatus Quoy & Gaimard, 1834 (Red Sea south to Durban) (syn. Aspidontus taeniatus tractusFowler, 1903)
Looseskin blenny Chalaroderma capito (Valenciennes, 1836) (Saldanha Bay to East London)
Two-eyed blenny Chalaroderma ocellata (Gilchrist and Thompson, 1908) (Saldanha Bay to Port Elizabeth)
Blackflap blenny Cirripectes auritus (Carlson, 1981) (Line islands, Philippines, Grand Comoro, Kenya and Sodwana Bay)
Muzzled rockskipper Cirripectes castaneus (Valenciennes, 1836) (Indo-West Pacific south to Sodwana Bay)
Golden blenny Ecsenius midas (Starck, 1969) (Red Sea to Sodwana Bay)
Nalolo Ecsenius nalolo Smith, 1959 (Red Sea to Sodwana Bay)
Fringelip rockskipper Entomacrodus epalzeocheilus (Bleeker, 1859) (Indo-Pacific, 1 specimen from Sodwana Bay)
Pearly rockskipper Entomacrodus striatus Quoy and Gaimard, 1836 (Western Indian Ocean to 30°S)
Leopard rockskipper Exilias brevis (Kner, 1868) (Red Sea to Sodwana Bay)
Highbrow rockskipper Hirculops cornifer (Rüppell, 1830) (Red Sea to Pondoland)
Streaky rockskipper Istiblennius dussumieri (Valenciennes, 1836) (Indo-Pacific south to Bashee River)
Rippled rockskipper Istiblennius edentulus (Forster & Schneider, 1801) (Indo-Pacific south to East London)
Picture rockskipper Istiblennius gibbifrons (Quoy & Gaimard, 1836) (Indo-West Pacific south to Sodwana Bay)
Impspringer Istiblennius impudens Smith, 1959 (Western Indian Ocean south to Sodwana Bay)
Bullethead rockskipper Istiblennius periophthalmus (Valenciennes, 1836) (Indo-Pacific south to Durban)
Rusi blenny Mimoblennius rusi Springer & Spreitzer, 1978 (Known only from Sodwana Bay area)
Bandit blenny Omobranchus banditus Smith, 1959 (Bazaruto to Port Alfred)
Kappie blenny Omobranchus woodi (Gilchrist & Thompson, 1908) (Eastern Cape estuaries, East London to Knysna)
Horned blenny Parablennius cornutus (Linnaeus, 1758) (Northern Namibia to Sodwana Bay, Endemic)
Ringneck blenny Parablennius pilicornis (Cuvier, 1829) (Knysna to Sodwana Bay)
Kosi rockskipper Pereulixia kosiensis (Regan, 1908) (Durban north to Pakistan)
Sabretooth blenny Petroscirtes breviceps (Valenciennes, 1836) (Natal to Japan and New Guinea)
Twostripe blenny Plagiotremus rhinorhynchos (Bleeker, 1853) (Indo-Pacific south to Knysna)
Piano blenny Plagiotremus tapeinosoma (Bleeker, 1857) (Indo-Pacific south to False Bay)
Maned blenny Scartella emarginata (Günther, 1861) (Southern Angola to India)
Japanese snakeblenny Xiphasia matsubarai Okada & Suzuki, 1952 (Western Indian Ocean south to False Bay)
Snakeblenny Xiphasia setifer Swainson, 1839 (Red Sea to False Bay)

Family: Clinidae — Klipfishes
Lace klipfish Blennioclinus brachycephalus (Valenciennes, 1836) (Melkboschstrand to Kei River)
Silverbubble klipfish Blennioclinus stella Smith, 1946 (Algoa Bay to north of Durban)
Snaky klipfish Blenniophis anguillaris (Valenciennes, 1836) (Lüderitz Bay to East London)
Striped klipfish Blenniophis striatus (Gilchrist & Thompson, 1908) (Saldanha Bay to East London)
Slender platanna-klipfish Cancelloxus burrelli Smith, 1961 (Orange River to Algoa Bay)
Whiteblotched klipfish Cancelloxus elongatus Heemstra and Wright, 1986 (Storms River mouth to Algoa Bay)
Barbelled klipfish Cirrhibarbus capensis Valenciennes, 1836 (Lamberts Bay to East London)
Fleet klipfish Climacoporus navalis Barnard, 1935 (Still Bay to Port St, Johns. Once from False Bay)
Ladder klipfish Clinoporus biporosus (Gilchrist and Thompson, 1908) (Saldanha Bay to False Bay)
Sad klipfish Clinus acuminatus (Schneider, 1801) (Lüderitz Bay to west of Algoa Bay)
Agile klipfish Clinus agilis Smith, 1931 (Namibia (20°49'S) to Port Alfred)
Onrust klipfish Clinus berrisfordi Penrith, 1967 (Weedy areas of False Bay to Skoenmakerskop, just west of Algoa Bay)
Cape klipfish Clinus brevicristatus Gilchrist & Thompson, 1908 (Lamberts Bay to False Bay)
Bluntnose klipfish Clinus cottoides Valenciennes, 1836 (Olifants River (Namaqualand) to Kei River)
Helen's klipfish Clinus helenae (Smith, 1946) (Boknes (west of Port Alfred) to Bashee River)
West coast klipfish Clinus heterodon Valenciennes, 1836 (Orange River to Cape Agulhas)(Swakopmund to False Bay)
False Bay klipfish Clinus latipinnis Valenciennes, 1836 (Table Bay to Cape Agulhas)
Chinese klipfish Clinus nemopterus Günther, 1861 (False Bay and Algoa Bay)
Robust klipfish Clinus robustus Gilchrist & Thompson, 1908 (Cape of Good Hope to East London)
Kelp klipfish Clinus rotundifrons Barnard, 1937 (Lüderitz Bay to Cape of Good Hope)
Bot river klipfish Clinus spatulatus Bennett, 1983 (Bot river and Kleinmond estuary)
Super klipfish or Highfin klipfish Clinus superciliosus (Linnaeus, 1758) (Namibia (18°59'S) to Kei River)
Bull klipfish Clinus taurus Gilchrist & Thompson, 1908 (Möwe Point (Namibia) to Port Alfred)
Speckled klipfish Clinus venustris Gilchrist & Thompson, 1908 (Orange River to East London)(Lüderitz Bay to Port Alfred)
Oldman klipfish Clinus woodi Smith, 1946 (Kei River to Inhambane)
Mousey klipfish Fuscomimus mus (Gilchrist & Thompson, 1908) (False Bay to Coffee Bay)
Nosestripe klipfish Muraenoclinus dorsalis (Bleeker, 1860) (Orange River to Durban)(Lüderitz Bay to southern Natal)
Grass klipfish Pavoclinus graminis (Gilchrist & Thompson, 1908) (False Bay to Inhambane)
Rippled klipfish Pavoclinus laurentii (Gilchrist & Thompson, 1908) (Port Elizabeth to Maputo) (Port Alfred to Inhambane)
Slinky klipfish Pavoclinus litorafontis Penrith, 1965 (False Bay; Strandfontein intertidal caulerpa beds, and Onrust river mouth)
Bearded klipfish Pavoclinus mentalis (Gilchrist & Thompson, 1908) (Algoa Bay to St. Lucia)
Mya's Klipfish Pavoclinus myae Christensen, 1978 (East London to Algoa Bay)
Peacock klipfish Pavoclinus pavo (Gilchrist & Thompson, 1908) (Lüderitz Bay to Kei River)
Deepwater klipfish Pavoclinus profundus Smith, 1961 (Off Knysna to Algoa Bay)
Deep reef klipfish Pavoclinus smalei Heemstra & Wright, 1986 (off Storm's River mouth)
Leafy klipfish Smithichthys fucorum (Gilchrist & Thompson, 1908) (Cape Point to Bashee River)
Platanna klipfish Xenopoclinus kochi Smith, 1948 (Lamberts Bay to Algoa Bay)
Leprous platanna klipfish Xenopoclinus leprosus Smith, 1961 (Orange River mouth to Algoa Bay)

Family: Tripterygiidae — Threefin blennies or Triplefins
Cape triplefin Cremnochorites capensis (Gilchrist & Thompson, 1908) (False Bay to Port Alfred)
Yellow triplefin Enneapterygius abeli (Klausewitz, 1960) (Red Sea to northern Natal)
Barred triplefin Enneapterygius clarckae (Holleman, 1982) (Red Sea to Natal)
Highcrest triplefin Enneapterygius pusillus Rüppell, 1835 (Red Sea to northern Natal)
Blotched triplefin Enneapterygius ventermaculus Holleman, 1982 (Natal to Pakistan)
Blackfin triplefin Helcogramma fuscopinna Holleman, 1982 (Indian Ocean south to Durban)
Hotlips triplefin Helcogramma obtusirostris (Klunzinger, 1871) (Red Sea to Coffee Bay)
Rough-head triplefin Norfolkia springeri Clark, 1979 (Natal to Red Sea)

Suborder: Callionymoidei

Family: Callionymidae — Dragonets
Longtail dragonet Callionymus gardineri Regan, 1908 (Indian Ocean south to Natal)
Sand dragonet Callionymus marleyi Regan, 1919 (Cape of Good Hope eastward to Persian Gulf)
Dainty dragonet Draculo celetus (Smith, 1963) (Known only from Eastern Cape, Durban and Inhaca island)
Ladder dragonet Paracallionymus costatus (Boulenger, 1898) (Lüderitz Bay to Inhaca)
Deep-water dragonet Synchiropus monacanthus Smith, 1935 (Port Alfred to Zanzibar)
Dwarf dragonet Synchiropus postulus Smith, 1963 (Sodwana Bay to Tanzania)
Starry dragonet Synchiropus stellatus Smith, 1963 (Sodwana Bay to northern Mozambique)

Suborder: Gobiesocoidei

Family: Gobiesocidae — Clingfishes
Chubby clingfish Apletodon pellegrini (Chabanaud, 1925) (Senegal (west Africa) to Port Alfred)
Rocksucker Chorisochismus dentex (Pallas, 1769) (Port Nolloth to northern KwaZulu-Natal)
Bigeye clingfish Diplecogaster megalops Briggs, 1955 (False Bay to Durban)
Weedsucker Eckloniaichthys scylliorhiniceps Smith, 1943 (Lüderitz to Kei River mouth)
Pale clingfish Lepadichthys caritus Briggs, 1969 (Sodwana Bay to Seychelles)
Eyestripe clingfish Lepadichthys coccinotaenia Regan, 1921 (Southern KwaZulu-Natal (31°S) to Tanzania)
Doubleline clingfish Lepadichthys lineatus Briggs, 1966 (Sodwana Bay and Red sea)
Mini-clingfish Pherallodus smithi Briggs, 1955 (Durban)

Suborder: Gobioidei

Family: Eleotridae — Sleepers
Duckbill sleeper Butis butis (Hamilton-Buchanan, 1922) (Tropical Indo-West pacific south to Mgeni Beachwood estuary)
Blackspot sleeper Butis melanostigma (Bleeker, 1849) (Port St Johns. Also tropical western Pacific)
Dusky sleeper Eleotris fusca (Schneider, 1801) (Tropical Indo-West Pacific south to Coffee Bay)
Widehead sleeper Eleotris mauritianus (Bennett, 1831) (Umtata River to Mozambique)
Broadhead sleeper Eleotris melanosoma Bleeker, 1852 (Tropical Indo-West Pacific south to Qora River)
Golden sleeper Hypseleotris dayi Smith, 1950 (Fresh and brackish water, St. Lucia and Empangeni, Natal)
Flathead sleeper Ophiocara porocephala (Valenciennes, 1837) (Durban to Shimoni)

Family: Gobiidae — Gobies
Subfamily Amblyopinae

Bulldog eelgoby Taenioides esquivel Smith, 1946 (Delagoa Bay to Transkei)
Bearded eelgoby Taenioides jacksoni Smith, 1943 (Estuaries of Natal)
Comb goby Trypauchen microcephalus Bleeker, 1860 (Indo-West Pacific south to Natal)

Subfamily Gobiinae

Mangrove goby Acentrogobius audax Smith, 1959 (Natal)
Pinkbar goby Amblyeleotris aurora (Polunin & Lubbock, 1977) (Islands of western Indian Ocean from Maldives southwards and northern Natal)
Gorgeous goby Amblyeleotris wheeleri (Polunin & Lubbock, 1977) (Indo-West Pacific south to Sodwana Bay)
Butterfly goby Amblygobius albimaculatus (Rüppell, 1830) (Read sea south to Durban)
Starryfin goby Asterropteryx semipunctatus Rüppell, 1830 (Ind-Pacific south to Durban)
Bearded goby Barbuligobius boehlkei Lachler & McKinney, 1974 (Tropical Indo-West Pacific south to Sodwana Bay)
Whitespotted goby Bathygobius albopunctataus(Valenciennes, 1837) (Inhaca south to Transkei)
Cocos frillgoby Bathygobius cocosensis (Bleeker, 1854) (Indo-Pacific south to Transkei)
Cheekscaled frillgoby Bathygobius cotticeps (Steindachner, 1880) (Indo-Pacific south to Coffee Bay)
Spotted frillgoby Bathygobius cyclopterus (Valenciennes, 1837) (Tropical Indo-West Pacific south to Transkei)
Brownboy goby Bathygobius laddi (Fowler, 1931) (Inhaca to Coffee Bay)
Black minigoby Bathygobius niger (Smith, 1960) (Transkei to Natal, also India and Sri-Lanka)
Brownlined goby Bathygobius sp. (Indo-West Pacific south to Xora River)
Agulhas goby Caffrogobius agulhensis (Barnard, 1927) (False Bay to East London)
Banded goby Caffrogobius caffer (Günther, 1874) (Natal to False Bay)
Prison goby Caffrogobius gilchristi (Boulenger, 1898) (Table Bay to Mozambique Island)(syn. Caffrogobius multifasciatus)
Baldy Caffrogobius natalensis (Günther, 1874) (Knysna to Natal)
Barehead goby Caffrogobius nudiceps (Valenciennes, 1827) (Walvis Bay to East London)
Commafin goby Caffrogobius saldanha (Barnard, 1927) (Saldanha Bay to southern Transkei)
Pacific goby Callogobius sclateri (Steindachner, 1880) (Sodwana Bay and tropical Pacific)
Kaalpens goby Coryogalops william (Smith, 1948) (Inhaca to Still Bay)(syn. Monishia william (Smith, 1947))
Naked goby Croilia mossambica Smith, 1955 (Southern Mozambique to south of Durban)
Sailfin goby Cryptocentrus pretoriusi Smith, 1958 (Known only from Pondoland)
Blackthroat goby Favonigobius melanobranchus (Fowler, 1934) (Indo-West Pacific south to Natal)
Tropical sand goby Favonigobius reichei Bleeker, 1953 (Indo-West Pacific south to Natal)
Barenape goby Fusigobius duospilus Hoese & Reader, 1985 (Indo-West Pacific south to Sodwana Bay)
Longspine goby Fusigobius longispinus Goren, 1978 (Kenya to Durban)
Sleepy goby Glossogobius biocellatus (Valenciennes, 1837) (Indo-Pacific south to East London)
River goby Glossogobius callidus (Smith, 1937) (Aldabra, Mozambique, south to Port Elizabeth)
Tank goby Glossogobius giuris (Hamilton-Buchanan, 1822) (Indo-West Pacific south to Port St. Johns)
Rippled coralgoby Gobiodon rivulatus (Rüppell) (Indo-West Pacific south to Sodwana Bay)
Poreless goby Hetereleotris apora (Hoese and Winterbottom, 1979) (Sodwana Bay)
Locusthead Hetereleotris tentaculata (Seychelles and Sodwana Bay)
Goggles Hetereleotris zonata (Fowler, 1934) (Natal to Port Alfred)
Smoothscale goby Hetereleotris margaretae Hoese, 1986 (Known only from Sodwana Bay)
Decorated goby Istigobius decoratus (Herre, 1927) (Indo-West Pacific south to Durban)
Pearl goby Istigobius spence (Smith, 1946) (Indo-West Pacific south to Sodwana Bay)
Taileyed goby Parachaeturichthyus polynema (Bleeker, 1953) (Indo-West Pacific south to Natal)
Redhead goby Paragobiodon echinocephalus (Rüppell, 1830) (Indo-West Pacific, associated with Stylophora coral)
Backfin goby Paragobiodon lacunicolis (Kendall & Goldsborough, 1911) (Indo-Pacific)
Emerald goby Paragobiodon xanthosomus (Bleeker, 1852) (Indo-West Pacific, associated with the coral Seriatopora hystrix)
Scalynape goby Pleurosicya annandalei (Hornell & Fowler, 1922) (Sodwana Bay)
Toothy goby Pleurosicya mossambica (Smith, 1959) (Sodwana Bay, Mozambique, Seychelles and tropical Indo-West Pacific)
Pleurosicya sp. 1 (Sodwana Bay, Seychelles, Chagos archipelago, tropical Indian Ocean and western tropical Pacific)
Convict goby Priolepis cincta (Regan, 1908) (Indo-West Pacific south to Natal)
Sodwana goby Priolepis sp. (Indo-West Pacific south to Sodwana Bay)
Knysna sandgoby Psammogobius knysnaensis Smith, 1935 (Port Nolloth to northern KwaZulu-Natal)
Barebreast goby Silhouettia sibayi Farquharson, 1970 (Known only from Lake Sibayi and Kosi Bay)
Pelagic goby Sufflogobius bibarbatus (von Bonde, 1923) (Port Nolloth to Saldanha Bay)
Polkadot goby Trimma corallina (Smith, 1969) (Phinda to Sodwana Bay)
Flame goby Trimma macrophthalma (Tomiyama, 1936) (Indo-West Pacific south to Sodwana Bay)
Pennant glider Valencienna strigata (Broussonet, 1787) (Indo-Pacific south to Sodwana Bay
Shadow goby Yongeichthys nebulosus (Forsskål, 1775) (Western tropical Pacific and Indian oceans south to Durban)

Subfamily Gobionellinae

Freshwater goby Awaous aeneofuscus (Peters, 1852) (Estuaries and freshwaters from Algoa Bay to Zambezi)
Weeper Gnatholepis sp. 1 (Western Indian Ocean south to Transkei)
Slender weeper Gnatholepis sp. 2 (Indo-Pacific south to Sodwana Bay)
Durban goby Mugilogobius durbanensis (Barnard, 1927) (Southern Mozambique to Coffee Bay)
Meander goby Mugilogobius inhacae (Smith, 1959) (Southern Mozambique to Natal)
Sharptail goby Oligolepis acutipennis(Valenciennes, 1837) (Indo-West Pacific south to Great Fish River)
Kei goby Oligolepis keiensis (Smith, 1938) (Seychelles, Madagascar and Inhaca to Fish River Mouth)
Maned goby Oxyurichthys microlepis (Bleeker, 1849) (Indo-West Pacific south to Xora River mouth)
Eyebrow goby Oxyurichthys ophthalmonema (Bleeker, 1857) (Indo-West Pacific south to Xora River mouth)
Dwarfgoby Pandaka silvana (Barnard, 1943) (Northern Mozambique to Knysna)
Bigmouth goby Redigobius bikolanus (Herre, 1927) (Indo-Pacific south to Coffee Bay)
Checked goby Redigobius dewaali (Weber, 1897) (Freshwater and estuarine, Southern Mozambique to Knysna)

Subfamily Oxudercinae

African mudhopper Periophthalmus kalolo Lesson, 1831 (Seychelles, Kenya to Transkei)(syn. Periophthalmus koelreuteri)
Bigfin mudhopper Periophthalmus argentilineatus Valenciennes, 1837(Port Alfred to Red Sea)(syn. Periophthalmus sobrinus Eggert, 1935)

Family: Microdesmidae — Gobies
Subfamilia: Ptereleotrinae

Fire goby Nemateleotris magnifica Fowler, 1938 (Sodwana Bay and Comores to Marquesas islands)
Scissortail Ptereleotris evides (Jordan & Hubbs, 1925) (Red Sea south to Natal)
Blacktail goby Ptereleotris heteroptera (Bleeker, 1855) (Indo-Pacific south to Natal)
Sad glider Ptereleotris lineopinnis (Fowler, 1935) (Umzumbi, Natal, 1 specimen)

Suborder: Labroidei

Family: Cichlidae — Cichlids
Mozambique tilapia Oreochromis mossambicus (Peters, 1852) (Estuaries and rivers from Bushmans River north)

Family: Labridae — Wrasses

Bluespotted tamarin Anampses caeruleopunctatus Rüppell, 1829 (Red Sea to Algoa Bay)
Lined tamarin Anampses lineatus Randall, 1972 (Red Sea south to Natal)
Yellowtail tamarin Anampses meleagrides Valenciennes, 1840 (Red Sea south to Sodwana Bay)
Natal wrasse Anchichoerops natalensis (Gilchrist & Thompson, 1908) (Known only from Natal and Transkei)
Lyretail hogfish Bodianus anthioides (Bennett, 1830) (Red Sea south to Sodwana Bay)
Turncoat hogfish Bodianus axillaris (Bennett, 1831) (Indo-Pacific south to Natal)
Saddleback hogfish Bodianus bilunulatus (Lacepède, 1801) (Indo-Pacific south to Durban)
Diana's hogfish Bodianus diana (Lacepède, 1801) (Port Elizabeth northwards)(Indo-Pacific south to Transkei)
Lined hogfish Bodianus leucostictus (Bennett, 1831) (Somalia south to Natal)
Goldsaddle hogfish Bodianus perditio (Quoy & Gaimard, 1834) (Northern Mozambique to Natal)
Two-spot wrasse Cheilinus bimaculatus Valenciennes, 1840 (Indo-Pacific south to Sodwana Bay)
Floral wrasse Cheilinus chlorourus (Bloch, 1791) (Indo-Pacific south to Sodwana Bay)
Cheeklined wrasse Cheilinus digrammus (Lacepède, 1801) (Red Sea south to Natal)
Snooty wrasse Cheilinus oxycephalus (Bleeker, 1853) (Indo-Pacific south to Natal)
Tripletail wrasse Cheilinus trilobatus Lacepéde, 1801 (Indo-Pacific south to Sodwana Bay)
Cigar wrasse Cheilio inermis (Forsskål, 1775) (Red sea south to Transkei)
Exquisite wrasse Cirrhilabrus exquisitus Smith, 1957 (East Africa south to Sodwana Bay)
Clown coris Coris aygula Lacepéde, 1801 (Indo-Pacific south to Transkei)
Spottail coris Coris caudimacula (Quoy & Gaimard, 1834) (Red Sea south to East London)
Queen coris Coris formosa (Bennett, 1830) (Indian Ocean south to Durban)
African coris Coris gaimard africana Smith, 1957 (Western Indian Ocean to 30°S)
Knife wrasse Cymolutes praetextatus (Quoy & Gaimard, 1834) (Indo-Pacific south to Natal)
Birdfish Gomphosus caeruleus Lacepède, 1801 (Port Alfred northwards)(Indian Ocean south to southern Natal)
Adorned wrasse Halichoeres cosmetus Randall and Smith, 1982 (Western Indian Ocean south to Aliwal Shoal)
Bubblefin wrasse Halichoerus dussumieri (Valenciennes, 1839) (Indo-West Pacific south to Durban)
Checkerboard wrasse Halichoeres hortulanus (Lacepède, 1801) (Indo-Pacific south to Sodwana Bay)
Rainbow wrasse Halichoeres iridis Randall & Smith 1982 (East African coast to Natal (30°S))
Jewelled wrasse Halichoeres lapillus Smith, 1947 (Mauritius, Madagascar and southern Mozambique to Natal)
Picture wrasse Halichoeres nebulosus (Valenciennes, 1839) (Indo-West Pacific south to Algoa Bay)
Zigzag sand wrasse Halichoeres scapularis(Bennett, 1831) (Red Sea to Natal)
Ringed wrasse Hologymnosus doliatus (Lacepéde, 1801) (Central Pacific to East Africa and south to southern Natal)
Bicoloured cleaner wrasse Labroides bicolor Fowler and Bean, 1928 (Indo-Pacific south to Natal)
Bluestreak cleaner wrasse Labroides dimidiatus (Valenciennes, 1839) (Indo-Pacific south to Algoa Bay)
Divided wrasse Macropharyngodon bipartitus Smith, 1957 (Western Indian Ocean south to Natal)
Bluespotted wrasse Macropharyngodon cyanoguttatus Randall, 1978 (Known only from Mauritius, Reunion and north coast of Natal)
Madagascar wrasse Macropharyngodon vivienae Randall, 1978 (Known only from Madagascar and Natal coast south to Durban)
Seagrass wrasse Novaculichthys macrolepidotus (Bloch 1791) (Red Sea south to Durban)
Rockmover wrasse Novaculichthys taeniourus (Lacepéde, 1801) (Indo-Pacific south to Natal)
Striated wrasse Pseudocheilinus evanidus (Jenkins, 1901) (Indo-Pacific south to Natal)
Sixstripe wrasse Pseudocheilinus hexataenia (Bleeker, 1857) (Indo-Pacific south to Natal)
Eightstripe wrasse Pseudocheilinus octotaenia Jenkins, 1900 (Indo-Pacific south to Natal)
Chiseltooth wrasse Pseudodax moluccanus (Valenciennes, 1839) (Indo-Pacific south to Sodwana Bay)
Smalltail wrasse Pseudojuloides cerasinus (Snyder, 1904) (Indo-Pacific south to Sodwana Bay)
Cocktail wrasse Pteragogus flagellifera (Valenciennes, 1839) (Indian Ocean south to Natal)
Sideburn wrasse Pteragogus pelycus Randall, 1981 (Western Indian Ocean south to Durban)
Bluelined wrasse Stethojulis albovittata Bonnaterre, 1788 (Red Sea to Natal)
Cutribbon wrasse Stethojulis interrupta (Bleeker, 1851) (Western Pacific to East Africa and south to Algoa Bay)
Three-ribbon wrasse Stethojulis strigiventer (Bennett, 1832) (Central Pacific to east Africa and south to Algoa Bay)
Twotone wrasse Thalassoma amblycephalum (Bleeker, 1856) (Indo-Pacific south to Transkei)
Redcheek wrasse Thalassoma genivittatum (Valenciennes, 1839) (Mauritius and Natal, where it is known from Aliwal Shoal)
Sixbar wrasse Thalassoma hardwicke (Bennett, 1828) (Indo-Pacific south to Bashee River)
Goldbar wrasse Thalassoma hebraicum (Lacepède, 1801) (Indian Ocean south to Algoa Bay)
Crescent-tail wrasse Thalassoma lunare (Linnaeus, 1758) Indo-Pacific south to Algoa Bay)
Rainbow wrasse or Surge wrasseThalassoma purpureum (Forsskål, 1775) (Indo-Pacific south to Algoa Bay)
Fivestripe wrasse Thalassoma quinquevittatum (Lay and Bennett, 1839) (Indo-Pacific south to Transkei (32°S))
Ladder wrasse Thalassoma trilobatum (Lacepéde, 1801) (Indo-Pacific south to Transkei)
Pearly razorfish Xyrichtys novacula (Linnaeus, 1758) (Both sides of the Atlantic, 1 doubtful record from Cape of Good Hope)
Peacock wrasse Xyrichtys pavo Valenciennes, 1840 (Red sea to Natal)
Fivefinger wrasse Xyrichtys pentadactylus (Linnaeus 1758) (Red Sea to Natal)

Family: Pomacentridae — Damselfishes
Fourbar damsel Abudefduf natalensis Hensley & Randall, 1983 (Transkei to Kosi Bay)
Dusky damsel Abudefduf notatus (Day, 1869) (Indo-West Pacific south to Kosi Bay)
Sevenbar damsel Abudefduf septemfasciatus (Cuvier, 1830) (Tropical Indo-West Pacific south to Durban)
Stripetail damsel Abudefduf sexfasciatus (Lacepède, 1801)
Spot damsel Abudefduf sordidus (Forsskål, 1775) (Indo-Pacific south to Port Alfred)
False-eye damsel Abudefduf sparoides (Cuvier, 1830) (Kenya to Transkei)
Sergeant major Abudefduf vaigiensis (Quoy & Gaimard, 1825) (Indo-West Pacific south to Port Alfred)
Nosestripe clownfish Amphiprion akallopisos Bleeker, 1853 (Tropical Indian Ocean south to Aliwal Shoal)
Twobar clownfish Amphiprion allardi Klausewitz, 1970 (East Africa south to Durban)
Bluespotted chromis Chromis dasygenys (Fowler, 1935) (Delagoa Bay to Durban)
Chocolate dip Chromis dimidiata (Klunzinger, 1871) (Tropical Indo-Pacific to Durban)
Brown chromis Chromis lepidolepis Bleeker, 1877 (Tropical Indo-Pacific south to Durban)
Blacktail chromis Chromis nigrura (Smith, 1960) (Tropical western Indian Ocean south to Transkei)
Doublebar chromis Chromis opercularis (Günther, 1867) (Tropical Indian Ocean south to Sodwana Bay)
Darkbar chromis Chromis weberi Fowler and Bean, 1928 (Tropical Indo-West Pacific south to Aliwal Shoal)
Footballer Chrysiptera annulata (Peters, 1855) (Red Sea to Durban)
Blue damsel Chrysiptera glauca (Cuvier, 1830) ((Indo-West Pacific south to Sodwana Bay)
Onespot damsel Chrysiptera unimaculata (Cuvier, 1830) (Indian Ocean south to Transkei)
Zebra humbug Dascyllus aruanus (Linnaeus, 1758) (Tropical Indo-West Pacific south to Durban)
Two-bar humbug Dascyllus carneus Fischer, 1885 (Tropical Indian Ocean south to Durban)
Domino Dascyllus trimaculatus (Rüppell, 1829) (Tropical Indo-West Pacific south to Great Fish Point))
Redwing coral damsel Lepidozygus tapeinosoma (Bleeker, 1856) (Tropical Indo-West Pacific south to Durban)
Crescent damsel Neopomacentrus cyanomos (Bleeker, 1856) (Tropical Indian Ocean south to Kosi Bay)
Narrowbar damsel Plectroglyphidodon dickii (Lienard, 1839) (Tropical Indo-West Pacific south to Sodwana Bay)
Stop-start damsel Plectroglyphidodon imparipennis (Vaillant and Sauvage, 1875) (Tropical Indo-West Pacific south to Sodwana Bay)
Widebar damsel Plectroglyphidodon johnstonianus Fowler and Ball, 1924 (Tropical Indo-West Pacific south to Sodwana Bay)
Jewel damsel Plectroglyphidodon lacrymatus (Quoy & Gaimard, 1825) (Tropical Indo-West Pacific south to Sodwana Bay)
Sash damsel Plectroglyphidodon leucozonus (Bleeker, 1859) (Tropical Indo-West Pacific to Transkei)
Phoenix damsel Plectroglyphidodon phoenixensis (Schultz, 1943) (Scattered localities in tropical Indo-West Pacific; Sodwana Bay)
Blue Pete Pomacentrus caeruleus Quoy & Gaimard, 1825 (Western Indian Ocean south to Durban)
Sapphire damsel Pomocentrus pavo (Bloch, 1787) (Tropical Indo-West Pacific south to Durban)
Yellowtail damsel Pomacentrus trichourus (Günther, 1867) (Red Sea south to Sodwana Bay)
Dark damsel Stegastes fasciolatus (Ogilby, 1889) (Kenya to Durban)

Family: Scaridae — Parrotfishes
Christmas parrotfish Calotomus carolinus (Valenciennes, 1840) (Eastern Pacific to Natal)
Blue humphead parrotfish Chlorurus cyanescens (Valenciennes, 1840) (Mauritius, Madagascar, Zanzibar and Natal to 30°S)(syn. Scarus cyanescens)
Marbled parrotfish Leptoscarus vaigiensis (Quoy and Gaimard, 1824) (East Africa south to Transkei)
Blue moon parrotfish Scarus atrilunula Randall and Bruce, 1983 (Kenya to Natal)
Redbarred parrotfish Scarus caudofasciatus (Günther, 1862) (Western Indian Ocean to Sodwana Bay)
Lunate parrotfish Scarus festivus Valenciennes, 1840 (French Polynesia to east Africa; observed off Sodwana Bay)
Bluebarred parrotfish Scarus ghobban Forsskål, 1775 (Red sea to Algoa Bay)
Roundhead parrotfish Scarus globiceps Valenciennes, 1840 (Indo-Pacific south to Sodwana Bay)
Dusky parrotfish Scarus niger Forsskål, 1775 (Indo-Pacific south to Sodwana Bay)
Palenose parrotfish Scarus psittacus Forsskål, 1775 (Red Sea south to Sodwana Bay)
Ember parrotfish Scarus rubroviolaceus Bleeker, 1847 (Eastern Pacific to Durban)
Eclipse parrotfish Scarus russelii (Tropical and subtropical Indian Ocean from India westwards but not Persian Gulf or Red Sea. One specimen from Sodwana Bay)
Fivesaddle parrotfish Scarus scaber Valenciennes, 1840 (East Africa south to Natal)
Bullethead parrotfish Scarus sordidus Forsskål, 1775 (Indo-Pacific south to Natal)
Tricolour parrotfish Scarus tricolor Bleeker, 1847 (East Africa south to Natal)

Suborder: Percoidei
See article List of marine fishes of the suborder Percoidei of South Africa

Suborder: Scombroidei

Family: Gempylidae — Snake mackerels
Snake mackerel Gempylus serpens Cuvier, 1829 (Worldwide in tropical and subtropical waters, sometimes in temperate latitudes)
Escolar Lepidocybium flavobrunneum (Smith, 1849) (Tropical and subtropical waters of all oceans)
Sackfish Neoepinnula orientalis (Gilchrist & von Bonde, 1924) (All oceans near edge of continental shelf and islands)
Oilfish Ruvettus pretiosus Cocco, 1879 (Tropical and temperate parts of all oceans)
Snoek Thyrsites atun (Euphrasen, 1791) (Namibia to Port Elizabeth)
Black snoek Thyrsitoides marleyi Fowler, 1929 (Indo-West Pacific south to Algoa Bay)

Family: Istiophoridae — Sailfish, spearfishes and marlins
Sailfish Istiophorus platypterus (Shaw, 1792) (Mossel Bay to Mozambique)
Black marlin Makaira indica (Cuvier, 1832) (Primarily Indo-Pacific to off Cape of Good Hope)
Blue marlin Makaira nigricans (Lacepèede, 1802) (Worldwide in all oceans)
White marlin Tetrapturus albidus Poey, 1861 (Atlantic Ocean)
Shortbill spearfish Tetrapturus angustirostris Tanaka, 1914 (Off Cape Point and Durban northwards throughout Indo-Pacific)
Striped marlin Tetrapturus audax (Philippi, 1887) (Primarily Indo-Pacific, but have been caught off Cape Town)
Longbill spearfish Tetrapturus pfluegeri Robins & de Sylva, 1963 (Apparently restricted to the Atlantic Ocean)

Family: Scombridae — Tunas, mackerels and bonitos
Subfamily: Gasterochismatinae

Bigscale mackerel Gasterochisma melampus Richardson, 1845 (Worldwide in southern ocean, mostly between 35° and 50° S, recorded from Table Bay)

Subfamily: Scombrinae

Wahoo Acanthocybium solandri (Cuvier, 1831) (Worldwide in tropical and subtropical waters. From South Africa: Algoa Bay, off Durban, and Sodwana Bay. one record west of Cape Point)
Slender Tuna Allothunnus fallai Serventy, 1948 (Worldwide between 20° and 50° S. From South Africa: Miller's Point and Rooikrans in False Bay)
Bullet tuna Auxis rochei Risso, 1810 (Cosmopolitan in warm waters. From South Africa: Hout Bay, Mossel Bay and Natal)
Frigate tuna Auxis thazard (Lacepède, 1800)
Eastern little tuna Euthynnus affinis (Cantor, 1849) (Mossel Bay to Delagoa Bay)
Dogtooth tuna Gymnosarda unicolor (Rüppell, 1836) (Tropical Indo-West Pacific. Redorded from off St. Lucia)
Skipjack tuna Katsuwonus pelamis (Linnaeus, 1758) (False Bay, Algoa Bay to Delagoa Bay)
Indian mackerel Rastrelliger kanagurta (Cuvier, 1816) (Durban to Red Sea)
Striped bonito Sarda orientalis (Temminck & Schlegel, 1844) (Cape St. Francis to Natal coast, Indo-Pacific)
Atlantic bonito Sarda sarda (Bloch, 1793) (Angola to Mossel Bay, perhaps as far as Durban)
Mackerel Scomber japonicus Houttuyn, 1782 (Namibia to Maputo)(Cape to Natal, cosmopolitan in warm waters)
King mackerel Scomberomorus commerson (Lacepède, 1800) (Indo-West Pacific to Mossel Bay. Once recorded from False Bay)
Queen mackerel Scomberomorus plurilineatus Fourmanoir, 1966 (Tsitsikamma to Kenya)
Albacore or Longfin tunnyThunnus alalunga (Bonnaterre, 1788) (Off Western Cape, Cosmopolitan between 45°-50°N and 30°-40°S)
Yellowfin tuna Thunnus albacares (Bonnaterre, 1788) (Angola to Natal)
Southern bluefin tuna Thunnus maccoyii (Castelnau, 1872) (Off Cape region in winter, probably throughout southern oceans south of 30°S)
Bigeye tuna Thunnus obesus (Lowe, 1839) (Off Cape region, Worldwide in tropical and subtropical waters)
Bluefin tuna Thunnus thynnus (Linnaeus, 1758) (Agulhas Bank and False Bay)

Family: Sphyraenidae — Barracudas
Sharp-fin barracuda Sphyraena acutipinnis Day, 1876 (Indo-Pacific south to Mossel Bay)
Great barracuda Sphyraena barracuda (Edwards, 1771) (Natal and all tropical seas except eastern Pacific)
Yellowstripe barracuda Sphyraena chrysotaenia Klunzinger, 1884 (Indo-Pacific south to East London)
Yellowtail barracuda Sphyraena flavicauda Rüppell, 1838 (Indo-Pacific south to Durban)
Pickhandle barracuda Sphyraena jello Cuvier, 1829 (Western Indian Ocean south to Knysna)
Sawtooth barracuda Sphyraena putnamiae Jordan & Seale, 1905 (Red Sea to Natal)
Blackfin barracuda Sphyraena qenie Klunzinger, 1870 (Indo-Pacific, reported from Natal)

Family: Trichiuridae — Frostfishes
Aphanopus mikhailini Parin, 1983 (Walters shoal)
Slender frostfish Benthodesmus elongatus elongatus (Clarke, 1879) (New Zealand, Australia and South Africa, once found off Natal)
Buttersnoek Lepidopus caudatus (Euphrasen, 1788) (Mediterranean, eastern Atlantic from Norway to South Africa, Australia and new Zealand)
Cutlass fish Trichiurus lepturus Linnaeus, 1758 (Cosmopolitan in tropical and temperate waters)

Family: Xiphiidae — Swordfishes
Swordfish Xiphias gladius Linnaeus, 1758 (Namibia to Natal)

Suborder: Stromateoidei

Family: Centrolophidae — Ruffs

Black ruff Centrolophus niger (Gmelin, 1789) (Temperate waters of Australia, New Zealand, South America and South Africa, also North Atlantic and Mediterranean)
Antarctic butterfish Hyperoglypha antarctica (Carmichael, 1818) (Temperate waters; islands of south Atlantic and southern Indian oceans; New Zealand, southern Australia and South Africa)
Schedophilus huttoni (Waite, 1910) (Circumglobal in southern ocean, taken off Cape Town, common off Namibia)
Black butterfish or Peregrine driftfishSchedophilus velaini (Sauvage, 1879) (Gulf of Guinea, to South Africa)(syn. Hyperoglypha moselii (Cunningham, 1910))
Flabby driftfish Tubbia tasmanica Whitley, 1943 (Temperate waters of Southern Ocean; New Zealand, Tasmania and South Africa off Natal)

Family: Nomeidae — Driftfishes

Black fathead Cubiceps baxteri McCulloch, 1923 (Atlantic, Pacific and Indian Oceans)
Blue fathead Cubiceps caeruleus Regan, 1914 (Southern Atlantic and Pacific Oceans)
Cape fathead Cubiceps capensis (Smith, 1845) (Probably circumglobal in southern hemisphere)
Longfin fathead Cubiceps pauciradiatus Günther, 1872 (Atlantic, Pacific and Indian Oceans)
Bluebottle fish Nomeus gronovi Gmelin, 1789 (Circumglobal in warm waters)
Banded driftfish Psenes arafurensis Günther, 1889 (Atlantic, Pacific and Indian Ocean)
Freckled driftfish Psenes cyanophrys Valenciennes, 1883 (Atlantic, Pacific and Indian Oceans)
Silver driftfish Psenes maculatus Lütken, 1880 (Atlantic, Pacific and Indian Oceans)
Blackrag Psenes pellucidus Lütken, 1880 (Atlantic, Pacific and Indian Oceans)
Shadow driftfish Psenes whiteleggi Waite, 1894 (Indian Ocean and Australia)

Family: Ariommatidae
Indian driftfish Ariomma indica (Day, 1870) (Mossel Bay eastwards  to Southern Japan)

Family: Tetragonuridae — Squaretails
Bigeye squaretail Tetragonuris atlanticus Lowe, 1839 (Atlantic Pacific and Indian oceans)
Smalleye squaretail Tetragonuris cuvieri Risso, 1810 (off Natal)

Family: Stromateidae
Blue butterfish Stromateus fiatola Linnaeus, 1758 (Eastern Atlantic and Mediterranean round the Cape to Natal)

Suborder: Trachinoidei

Family: Ammodytidae — Sandlances
Scaly sandlance Bleekeria renniei Smith, 1857 (Known only from East London to Port Alfred and the Seychelles)
Cape sandlance Gymnammodytes capensis (Barnard, 1927) (Angola to Delagoa Bay)

Family: Champsodontidae — Gapers
Gaper Champsodon capensis (Regan, 1908) (Cape of Good Hope to Durban)

Family: Chiasmodontidae — Swallowers
Chiasmodon niger Johnson, 1863 (Tropical/subtropical in the three major oceans)
Kali macrodon (Norman, 1929) (Tropical/subtropical in the three major oceans, taken off Cape Town and Natal)

Family: Creediidae — Sand burrowers
longfin burrower Apodocreedia vanderhorsti de Beaufort, 1948 (Durban to Delagoa Bay)
Sand submarine Limnichthys nitidus Smith 1958 (Red Sea south to Chaka's Rock Natal)

Family: Percophidae — Duckbills
Bembrops platyrhynchus (Alcock, 1893) (off Natal)
Osopseron natalensis Nelson, 1982 (3 specimens off Kosi Bay)
Pteropsaron heemstrai Nelson, 1982 (2 specimens off southern Natal)

Family: Pinguipedidae — Sandsmelts
Blacktail sandsmelt Parapercis hexopthalma (Ehrenberg, 1829) (Red Sea to Durban)
Deepwater sandsmelt Parapercis maritzi Anderson, 1992 (Natal and Transkei)
Spotted sandsmelt Parapercis punctulata (Cuvier, 1829) (Northern Natal)
Smallscale sandsmelt Parapercis robinsoni Fowler, 1929 (Persian Gulf to Algoa Bay)
Rosy sandsmelt Parapercis schauinslandii (Steindachner, 1900) (Hawaii, Seychelles, Comores, and Durban)
Blotchlip sandsmelt Parapercis xanthozona Bleeker, 1849 (Indo-West Pacific, 2 specimens from Natal)

Family: Trichonotidae — Sand divers
Sand diver Trichonotus marleyi (Smith, 1936) (Known only from Durban to Delagoa Bay)

Family: Uranoscopidae — Stargazers
Spotted stargazer Pleuroscopus pseudodorsalis Barnard, 1927 (off Table Bay and Algoa Bay)
Stargazer Uranoscopus archionema Regan, 1921 (Mossel Bay to Kenya)

Suborder: Zoarcoidei

Family: Zoarcidae — Eelpouts
Lycodes agulhensis Andriashev, 1959 (Cap Blanc, Mauretania to Agulhas Bank)
Lycodonus vermiformis Barnard, 1927 (off Cape Point)
Melanostigma gelatinosum Günther, 1881 (off Cape Town)

References

'perciform
South Africa
Fishes
Marine biodiversity of South Africa